is a Japanese manga series written and illustrated by Satsuki Satō. It was serialized in Shogakukan's Weekly Shōnen Sunday from April 2017 to November 2021, with its chapters collected in eleven tankōbon volumes.

Publication
Written and illustrated by Satsuki Satō, Yōkai Giga was serialized in Shogakukan's Weekly Shōnen Sunday from April 26, 2017, to November 24, 2021. Shogakukan collected its chapters in eleven tankōbon volumes, released from September 15, 2017, to March 17, 2022.

Volume list

Reception
The series was recommended by manga author Inio Asano. Gō Sasakibara of The Asahi Shimbun commended the depiction of the yōkai creatures presented in the series and compared Satō's detailed art with humorous touch to Shigeru Mizuki's work, the late manga artist and yōkai specialist known for GeGeGe no Kitarō.

Notes

References

External links
 

Shogakukan manga
Shōnen manga
Supernatural anime and manga
Yōkai in anime and manga